Emma Lundberg is a Swedish cell biologist who is a professor at KTH Royal Institute of Technology and Director of Cell Profiling at the Science for Life Laboratory. Her research considers spatial proteomics and cell biology, making use of an antibody-based approach to assess fundamental aspects of human biology. She looks to understand why certain variations in human proteins can cause disease.

Early life and education 
Lundberg was an undergraduate and postgraduate student at the KTH Royal Institute of Technology. Her doctoral research introduced bio imaging as a means to understand expression in cells.

Research and career 
Lundberg combines computational investigations with experimental analysis to identify the spatiotemporal expression of proteins at the level of single cells. Eukaryotic cells can support multiple processes in parallel due to the compartmentalisation of biological processes. Each specific compartment describes a particular cellular function and the molecular controllers required to complete a specific function. When defects occur within the compartments, they can give rise to various forms of human disease.

Lundberg seeks to facilitate access to science and science communication. She created the human protein atlas the Cell Atlas, which looks to identify the sub cellular localisation of all human proteins. She was involved with the launch of “Project Discovery”, a citizen science project that uses members of the public to classify protein patterns. She integrated this project with Eve Online, a gaming platform.

Lundberg spent over two years at the Stanford School of Medicine. She has since made use of artificial intelligence to better understand microscopy images. The models created by Lundberg assist with image acquisition, processing and analysis. They can be used to segment data, enabling statistical analysis. Preliminary work indicated that human cells were considerably more complex than previously thought, including proteins that form into unfamiliar structures.

Awards and honours 
 2016 Wallenberg Academy Fellow
 2017 Swedish National Association of Chemical Engineers (Sveriges Kemiingenjörers Riksförening -SKR) annual prize 
 2018 Genetic Engineering & Biotechnology News Top 10 Under 40
 2021 Royal Microscopical Society Scientific Achievement Award

Selected publications

References 

Living people
KTH Royal Institute of Technology alumni
Cell biologists
21st-century women scientists
Year of birth missing (living people)
21st-century biologists
Women biologists
Swedish biologists